The liver-colored moray (Gymnothorax hepaticus) is a moray eel found in coral reefs in the Pacific and Indian Oceans. It was first named by Eduard Rüppell in 1830.

References

hepaticus
Fish described in 1830